Eleocharis pallens, commonly known as pale spikerush, is a sedge of the family Cyperaceae that is native to Australia.

It blooms between July and August and produces green flowers.

It is found in and around swampy areas and pools in the Pilbara, Gascoyne and Goldfields-Esperance regions of Western Australia and the top end of the Northern Territory.

References

Plants described in 1938
Flora of Western Australia
pallens